The 1938 United States Senate election in Oklahoma took place on November 8, 1938. Incumbent Democratic Senator Elmer Thomas ran for re-election to a third term. He faced a spirited challenge in the Democratic primary from Congressman Gomer Smith and Governor E. W. Marland, but won the nomination with a slim plurality. In the general election, Thomas faced former State Senator Harry O. Glasser, the Republican nominee. Despite the nationwide trend favoring Republicans, Thomas overwhelmingly won re-election.

Democratic primary

Candidates
 Elmer Thomas, incumbent U.S. Senator
 Gomer Smith, U.S. Congressman from Oklahoma's 5th congressional district, 1932 Democratic candidate for the U.S. Senate
 E. W. Marland, Governor of Oklahoma
 Charles Francis Smith

Results

Republican primary

Candidates
 Harry O. Glasser, former State Senator
 James D. Davidson, real estate salesman
 William Oliver Cromwell, former Oklahoma Attorney General, 1914 Progressive nominee for the U.S. Senate
 Wilfred Marion Leise

Results

Prohibition primary

Candidates
 P. C. Nelson
 A. B. Lamb

Results

General election

Results

References

Oklahoma
1938
1938 Oklahoma elections